Rosano may refer to:

 Pietro Rosano, an Italian politician and lawyer
 Sebastián Rosano, a Uruguayan footballer